The 1999–2000 Perth Glory SC season was the club's fourth in the Australian National Soccer League (NSL). The club won the NSL minor premiership as the leading team in the league. In the Grand Final, the Glory missed out on the NSL championship when they lost in a penalty shoot-out after surrendering a 3–0 half-time lead.

Background
In 1998–99, Perth Glory finished third on the NSL table, being eliminated in the preliminary final by eventual losing grand-finalists Sydney United.

Perth Glory entered the 1999–2000 season as one of the favourites to win the championship, with SportsTAB offering odds of 4/1, placing them second to South Melbourne (7/2). Ray Gatt in The Australian predicted the Glory as champion, calling the signings of Kasey Wehrman, Peter Buljan and Hamilton Thorp "coups" while former Australia national soccer team coach Rale Rasic in Action Soccer tipped the Glory as runners-up.

Season review

Coaching
In February 2000, Glory chairman Nic Tana announced that coach Bernd Stange would be leaving the club at the end of the season. Despite club management and the board agreeing to a two-year contract extension, Tana as 75 percent club shareholder, had called a shareholder meeting and blocked the extension. The decision was unpopular with supporters with a protest occurring before the round 23 match against Canberra Cosmos. In late February, Tana reversed his decision and offered Stange a new one-year contract. In April, Stange finally agreed to the new deal.

Final series

As minor premiers, Perth Glory won the right to proceed to week two of the NSL finals. In the first leg of the major semi-final, they lost to Wollongong Wolves 1–0 at Brandon Park, the Wolves' home ground.

The second leg of the major semi-final was held at Subiaco Oval, rather than their regular venue Perth Oval, to accommodate an expected larger crowd. In the match, Perth Glory win 2–0 over the Wolves, 2–1 on aggregate, to qualify for the grand final. The crowd of 42,764 was an Australian record for a club soccer match. In the wake of the record crowd, the Western Australian government announced a purpose-built stadium for the Glory in central Perth.

The 2000 National Soccer League Grand Final was held at Subiaco on 11 June. The match was seemingly over at halftime, with Perth Glory leading 3–0, however the Wolves came back to draw the match in the 89th minute. The score remained 3–3 at the completion of extra time, with the match going to a penalty shootout to determine the champion. Wollongong won the shootout 7–6 with James Afkos, son of Glory co-owner Paul Afkos, missing a penalty. The crowd of 43,242 was a new record for an Australian club soccer match, standing until 2006. The match was also the first national league grand final to feature teams not aligned with a particular ethnic group.

Results

Legend

League

Final series

Squad statistics

Statistics accurate as at the end of the 1999–2000 NSL season.

Transfers

In

Out

References

Perth Glory FC seasons
1999 in Australian soccer
2000 in Australian soccer